LaVan Davis is an American actor who played the character Curtis Payne on Tyler Perry's TV shows House of Payne and The Paynes TBS Network (2007–2012), OWN Network (2018) and BET Network (2020–present).

Career
Davis' acting career began in 2004 with his first role as Leroy in the film Mindbenders. In 2005, he made a guest appearance in a two episodes of Everybody Hates Chris as a preacher. The following year, Davis was cast as the cranky patriarch of the Payne family, Curtis Payne, in the TBS sitcom Tyler Perry's House of Payne. Davis worked with Perry again in two of his feature films including Daddy's Little Girls in 2007 and Tyler Perry's Meet the Browns in 2008.

In addition to his work in films and television, Davis has also appeared in the stage plays Why Did I Get Married? as Poppy, and Madea Goes to Jail as Leo.

Filmography

References

External links
 

Living people
African-American male actors
American male stage actors
American male film actors
American male television actors
Musicians from Atlanta
Male actors from Georgia (U.S. state)
Year of birth missing (living people)